The name Ana has been used for eleven tropical cyclones worldwide: eight in the Atlantic Ocean, one in the Central Pacific Ocean, one in the South Pacific, and one in the South-West Indian Ocean. It has also been used for two extratropical European windstorms.

In the Atlantic:
Tropical Storm Ana (1979), formed east of the Lesser Antilles and crossed Leeward Islands
Tropical Storm Ana (1985), curved around Bermuda and neared Newfoundland, but dissipated offshore
Tropical Storm Ana (1991), paralleled the East Coast of the United States before moving out to sea
Tropical Storm Ana (1997), formed off the coast of the Carolinas and moved northeastward away from land
Tropical Storm Ana (2003), pre-season storm that moved generally eastward across the central Atlantic
Tropical Storm Ana (2009), which crossed the Leeward Islands and dissipated near Puerto Rico
Tropical Storm Ana (2015), pre-season storm that made landfall in South Carolina
Tropical Storm Ana (2021), pre-season storm that churned in the open ocean

In the Central Pacific:
Hurricane Ana (2014), brought heavy rain to the Hawaiian Islands

In the South Pacific:
Cyclone Ana (2021), brought flooding to portions of Fiji

In the South-West Indian:
Tropical Storm Ana (2022), crossed northern Madagascar, causing severe flooding, and then made landfall in Mozambique  

In Europe:
 Storm Ana (2017), impacted much of Western Europe and Scandinavia.
 Storm Ana (2022), impacted Italy.

Atlantic hurricane set index articles
Pacific hurricane set index articles